Andrea Mason (born 1968) is a former Australian political candidate. At the 2004 federal election, she led the Family First Party, standing unsuccessfully as its lead Senate candidate in South Australia. She gained notability as the first Aboriginal woman to lead an Australian political party to a federal election. Mason was the Coordinator, now known as the Chief Executive Officer, of the Ngaanyatjarra, Pitjantjatjara and Yankunytjatjara Women's Council (NPYWC) from March 2015 to April 2019.

Background and career
Mason is the daughter of Ben Mason, an Aboriginal Christian pastor involved in the founding of the Aboriginal Evangelical Fellowship, she was born in Subiaco, Western Australia. She grew up in Western Australia before her family moved to Adelaide, South Australia in 1979. After completing her secondary education she was awarded a Netball Scholarship at the Australian Institute of Sport and moved to Canberra for two years. On her return to Adelaide, Mason studied for a Bachelor of Arts degree in Aboriginal Affairs and Public Administration.  She graduated in 1988, and from 1989 onwards she worked on housing and employment programs with the South Australian Public Service. In 1999, Mason commenced a Bachelor of Laws Degree at the University of Adelaide. Graduating in 2002, she began working for Andrew Evans, a member of the South Australian Legislative Council and leader of the South Australian branch of the Family First Party, as a personal assistant.

On 8 August 2004, Mason became the first-ever Indigenous Australian woman to lead an Australian political party, when the Family First Party chose her as its national leader. She unsuccessfully contested the 2004 Australian federal election as the party's South Australian lead Australian Senate candidate.

In 2019 Mason was appointed to serve as a commissioner to the Royal Commission into Violence, Abuse, Neglect and Exploitation of People with Disability.

Awards
 2016 Telstra Australian Businesswoman of the Year

References

External links
2006 bio previously posted on the Family First Party Website

Family First Party politicians
1968 births
Living people
Indigenous Australian politicians
Indigenous Australians from Western Australia
Politicians from Perth, Western Australia
University of Adelaide alumni
Australian Institute of Sport netball players
Leaders of political parties in Australia
Australian netball players
Netball players from Western Australia
Indigenous Australian netball players